Lake Labaz is a large freshwater lake in Krasnoyarsk Krai, north-central part of Russia. The Kegerdi River flows from the lake.

See also
List of lakes of Russia

References

Lakes of Krasnoyarsk Krai